Sameer C. Thahir  (born 7 November 1976) is an Indian cinematographer, screenwriter, and film director and producer who works mainly in the Malayalam cinema while also having worked in a few Tamil films.

He is a graduate of Maharajas College, Ernakulam where he nurtured his passion for photography and cinema. He began his career assisting his mentors, fellow ISC members Amal Neerad and Rajeev Ravi.

In 2007 he shot his first feature as an independent Cinematographer when Amal Neerad turned to direct his debut film Big B. The unique approach to the visual vista and the massive success of the film

. By next year he helmed Aashiq Abu's superhit film Daddy Cool (2009). And since then, he has gone on to lend his visual expertise to path breaking films as Nidra (2012), Diamond Necklace (2012), Bangalore Days (2014), Thamaasha (2019) and Minnal Murali (2021) etc. With director Soundarya Rajnikanth's comedy Velaiilla Pattadhari 2 (2017) he set foot in Tamil Cinema. The next year he shot Priyadarshan's critically acclaimed Sometimes (2018).

Early life
Thahir studied in Maharajas College Eranakulam. His mentor was Amal Neerad, for whom he handled cinematography in "Big B", director Anwar Rasheed, Aashiq Abu, and cinematographer Rajeev Ravi for whom Thahir has assisted in films were just some of them from Maharajas friendship circle.

Career
Thahir made his debut with Big B, the first film directed by cinematographer Amal Neerad, in 2007. Later, he made his directorial and writing debut with Chaappa Kurishu (2011).

In 2012, he handled cinematography for Siddharth Bharathan's Nidra and Lal Jose's Diamond Necklace. Thahir directed a segment in anthology film 5 Sundarikal in 2013. Later in the year 2013 his second film as a director Neelakasham Pachakadal Chuvanna Bhoomi was released.

Thahir handled camera for 2014 movie Bangalore Days, directed by Anjali Menon. In 2015, he produced the movie Chandrettan Evideya under his banner Happy Hours Entertainments. He produced and directed Dulquer Salmaan starred Kali in 2016. Sameer Thahir was the cinematographer of the 2017 Tamil movie Velaiilla Pattadhari 2 and Priyadarshan's Sometimes (2018). He was the producer of Sudani from Nigeria (2018) and Thamaasha (2019), in which he also handled the cinematography of the latter.

Personal life
Sameer C. Thahir married his wife Neethu Thahir on 12 November 2013.

Filmography

References

External links
 

Malayalam film producers
Malayalam film directors
Malayalam film cinematographers
Living people
1986 births
Film producers from Kochi
Film directors from Kochi
Tamil film cinematographers
21st-century Indian film directors
21st-century Indian photographers
Cinematographers from Kerala
Screenwriters from Kochi